Maha Purusha is a 1985 Indian Kannada-language film, produced and directed by Joe Simon, H. G. Raju, K. S. Nataraju and D. J. Nayak. The film stars Vishnuvardhan, Gayatri, Jai Jagadish and Chandrashekar. The film has musical score by Chellapilla Satyam.

Cast

Vishnuvardhan
Gayatri
Jai Jagadish
Chandrashekar
Roopadevi
Pramila Joshai
Renuka
Sulakshana in Guest Appearance
Chethan Ramarao
B. K. Shankar
K. V. Manjaiah
Gopala Krishna
Aravind
Krishna Gaithonde
Kakolu Ramaiah
Veerendra Kumar
Nagaraj
Idris
Nataraj
Vinay
Jr. Narasimharaju
Aparichitha Aravind
Prabhu
Baby Hema
Kamala
Vimala
Anupama
Vijayalakshmi
Bharath

Soundtrack
The music was composed by Satyam.

References

External links
 
 

1985 films
1980s Kannada-language films
Films scored by Satyam (composer)